Crusaders Strikers Football Club is a women's association football club based in North Belfast, Northern Ireland. The club was founded in 1992 as Newtownabbey Strikers and became a member of the Northern Ireland Women's Football Association in 1994. In 2009, Newtownabbey Strikers amalgamated with Crusaders F.C. to become Crusaders Strikers.

The team has won the Women's Premier League of Northern Ireland six times

First-team squad

European record
In UEFA competitions the strikers have achieved two draws so far against FC Clujana Cluj and Maccabi Holon. The club played in the 2010–11 UEFA Women's Champions League qualifying round hosting the mini-tournament but lost all their games.

UEFA Women's Cup:
 2003–04: 2nd qualifying round, 4th
 2004–05: 2nd qualifying round, 4th
 2006–07: 1st qualifying round, 4th

UEFA Women's Champions League:
 2010-11: qualifying round, 4th
 2011–12: qualifying round, 4th
 2013-14: qualifying round, 4th

Northern Ireland Internationals
 internationals
 Julie Nelson

 U19 internationals
 Beth Chalmers
 Faith Johnston
 Maddy Harvey-Clifford
 Jessica Rea
 Sasha Clare
 Holly Otter
 Rachel McLaren

Titles
Women's Premiership
Winners (6): 2002, 2003, 2005, 2009, 2010, 2012
IFA Women's Challenge Cup 
Winners (2): 2005, 2011

Crusaders Strikers Football Development Centre/Girls Academy

Crusaders Strikers have the most established girls' Football Development Centre in Northern Ireland. 
Catering for girls aged 4–18 were the players can develop their football skills in a safe and inclusive environment.

The FDC aims to bring girls through the pathway to senior football, while also promoting lifetime participation.

The FDC has had a lot of success over the years, with a lot of the current first team being made up of academy graduates.

The FDC/academy philosophy is 'to develop good players and good people.'

References

External links
Club's website

Women's association football clubs in Northern Ireland
1992 establishments in Northern Ireland
Crusaders F.C.
Association football clubs established in 1992